North Suburban Synagogue Beth El is a large Conservative Jewish synagogue. It is located on a 6-1/2 acre campus overlooking Lake Michigan at 1175 Sheridan Road in Highland Park, Illinois. Beth El was founded in 1946 following a series of parlor meetings in Glencoe, Illinois initiated by Benjamin and Gertrude Harris. The synagogue was incorporated as an Illinois not-for-profit corporation in 1947 with Arnold P. Natenberg as its first president.

Building
Beth El acquired its permanent home in 1948, a lavish "showcase" private residential mansion constructed in 1911 by Edward Valentine Price, a wealthy wholesale men's clothing manufacturer and owner of Ed. V. Price and Co. in Chicago. The Price mansion was designed by renowned architect Ernest Mayo.   

The Price mansion today houses the synagogue's library, the Beit Midrash (small sanctuary), educational offices, and classrooms. In 1953 a school building designed by architect Isadore H. Braun was constructed adjacent to the Price mansion, and in 1956 a large auditorium with catering facilities and a youth lounge was added. A formal sanctuary designed by acclaimed architect Percival Goodman was completed in 1962 with interior accouterments designed by well-known Jewish artist Ludwig Wolpert. An administrative wing and an extension of the school building, both designed by architects Bernheim & Kahn, were added to the synagogue in 1989.

Congregation
Beth El grew from twenty-five family members at the time of its founding to over 1000 families in 2022. It currently operates an award winning pre-school, a large supplemental religious school and, in cooperation with other Conservative synagogues in the area, a Hebrew High School program. A robust continuing education program, a 20,000 volume library (accredited by the Association of Jewish Libraries), and a diverse museum collection that encompasses paintings, sculptures, prints, rare books and Judaic ritual objects from around the world, all contribute to create a strong Jewish educational experience for the community.

Rabbis
Beth El's first rabbi was Maurice I. Kliers, who served from 1948 to 1950, when he left to join South Side Hebrew Congregation in Chicago. Philip L. Lipis, a US Navy chaplain during World War II, joined Beth El in 1951. Rabbi Lipis oversaw the rapid growth in membership and the physical expansion of the synagogue's facilities. He was instrumental in strengthening the educational aspects of the congregation, particularly the youth and adult education programming. Rabbi Lipis retired in 1969 and moved to California, where he taught at the University of Judaism (now the American Jewish University).

Samuel H. Dresner became senior rabbi at Beth El in 1969. A leading scholar and author within the Conservative movement, he drew hundreds of congregants to Shabbat morning services to hear him preach. Dedicated to strengthening religious practice, Rabbi Dresner also took steps to enhance the role of women in religious services. In 1977 Dresner left the synagogue following a contentious internal struggle over his continuation as senior rabbi. That year he became the founding rabbi of Moriah Congregation in Deerfield, Illinois.

William H. Lebeau succeeded Rabbi Dresner in 1978. Rabbi Lebeau was a rising star in the Conservative movement who impressed the congregation with his warmth and vision for the development of the synagogue's educational programming and facilities. He left Beth El in 1987 to serve as Vice-Chancellor of the Jewish Theological Seminary in New York and dean of its rabbinical school.  

Vernon H. Kurtz was installed as senior rabbi of Beth El in 1988 and served in that role until his retirement in 2018 when he moved to Israel. Rabbi Kurtz was a serious proponent of Conservative Judaism and of the State of Israel, serving in top leadership positions in numerous local, national and international Jewish organizations throughout his tenure at the congregation and establishing himself as a well-known and influential leader in the American Jewish community.

Michael Schwab began his rabbinic career at Beth El in 2004 as assistant rabbi of the congregation and was named Senior Rabbi in 2019. He has brought to Beth El a strong sense of community, a deep love for Israel, an unbridled enthusiasm for serving others, and an uplifting sense of joy in teaching and practicing Jewish traditions. Rabbi Schwab occupies the Vernon H. Kurtz Senior Rabbinic Chair. The current associate rabbi is Alex Freedman.

Cantors
Throughout its history, Beth El has striven to enhance its religious services with talented hazzanim (cantors). Among these were Cantor Jordan Cohen (1953-1969), Cantor Reuven Frankel (1970-1979), Hazzan Henry Rosenblum (1987-1998), Hazzan Larry B. Goller (1998-2015) and Hazzan Benjamin A. Tisser (2015-2021). The current cantor is Hazzan Jacob Sandler, a 2020 graduate of the H. L. Miller Cantorial School at the Jewish Theological Seminary.

References

Highland Park, Illinois
Buildings and structures in Lake County, Illinois
Conservative synagogues in Illinois
Jewish organizations established in 1948